Wilcox County School District may refer to:
Wilcox County School District (Alabama)
Wilcox County School District (Georgia)